Eastern Shuttle can refer to:
Eastern Air Lines Shuttle, a former air shuttle service on the East Coast of the United States
Eastern Shuttle (bus company), a bus operator